The Humphries Ministry was the seventh ministry of the Government of the Australian Capital Territory, and was led by Liberal Chief Minister Gary Humphries and his deputy, Brendan Smyth. It was sworn in on 19 October 2000, after the forced resignation of Humphries' predecessor Kate Carnell over the Bruce Stadium affair, and the elevation of Deputy Chief Minister Humphries and new deputy Smyth.

Though Carnell resigned from parliament upon losing the Chief Minister position, she was initially sworn into an interim junior portfolio in the ministry of her successor, until a full ministry could be sworn in during December. The ministry operated until 13 November 2001, when the Labor First Stanhope Ministry was sworn in after the Liberal defeat in the 2001 election.

First arrangement

This covers the period from 19 October 2000 (when the Ministry was sworn in) until the reshuffle on 15 December forced by the resignation from politics of Kate Carnell. Carnell had technically continued to hold a number of minor ministerial portfolios after her resignation as Chief Minister, despite her also resigning from parliament at the same time.

Second arrangement

This covers the period from 15 December 2000, until the until 13 November 2001 and was brought about following the resignation from the Assembly from the earlier deposed former Chief Minister Carnell. Carnell was not replaced in the ministry, and Humphries decided to continue to the election with only four ministers after distributing Carnell's portfolios among the remaining members. The reporting of Moore in the list of ministers, in terms of hierarchy, shifted to the bottom of the ministerial list.

References

Australian Capital Territory ministries